Plymouth is a village in Hancock and McDonough counties, Illinois, United States. The population was 436 at the 2020 census, down from 505 in 2010.

Geography
A small portion of the village extends east into the southwest corner of McDonough County. Illinois Route 61 passes through the village, leading northeast  to Colmar and southwest  to Augusta.

The village drains north toward Bronson Creek and south toward Flour Creek, both east-flowing tributaries of the La Moine River and part of the Illinois River watershed.

Demographics

As of the census of 2000, there were 562 people, 234 households, and 146 families residing in the village. The racial makeup of the village was 95.73% White, 0.18% African American, 0.18% Native American, 1.25% Asian, 0.53% from other races, and 2.14% from two or more races. Hispanic or Latino of any race were 0.89% of the population.

There were 234 households, out of which 31.2% had children under the age of 18 living with them, 51.3% were married couples living together, 9.0% had a female householder with no husband present, and 37.6% were non-families. 32.5% of all households were made up of individuals, and 17.9% had someone living alone who was 65 years of age or older.  The average household size was 2.40 and the average family size was 3.00.

In the village, the population was spread out, with 28.5% under the age of 18, 8.2% from 18 to 24, 26.2% from 25 to 44, 19.6% from 45 to 64, and 17.6% who were 65 years of age or older.  The median age was 36 years. For every 100 females, there were 93.1 males.  For every 100 females age 18 and over, there were 87.0 males.

The median income for a household in the village was $24,500, and the median income for a family was $30,139. Males had a median income of $24,479 versus $22,083 for females. The per capita income for the village was $12,150.  About 16.8% of families and 18.8% of the population were below the poverty line, including 23.2% of those under age 18 and 12.5% of those age 65 or over.

Education 
Residents attend Southeastern High School which is located in nearby Augusta.

References

Villages in Hancock County, Illinois
Villages in McDonough County, Illinois
Villages in Illinois